The 2014 United States Senate election in Massachusetts was held on November 4, 2014, to elect a member of the United States Senate to represent the Commonwealth of Massachusetts, concurrently with the election of the Governor of Massachusetts, other elections to the United States Senate in other states and elections to the United States House of Representatives and various state and local elections.

Incumbent Democratic Senator Ed Markey ran for re-election to a first full term in office. Primary elections were held on September 9, 2014. Markey was unopposed for the Democratic nomination; Hopkinton Selectman Brian Herr was also unopposed for the Republican nomination.

Background 
Incumbent Democratic Senator John Kerry, serving since 1985, had planned to run for re-election to a sixth term, but on December 15, 2012, it was announced that the long-time Massachusetts senator and 2004 presidential nominee would be nominated as United States Secretary of State under President Barack Obama. Massachusetts Governor Deval Patrick appointed Mo Cowan as a temporary replacement for Kerry, after he was confirmed as Secretary of State and therefore resigned his senate seat.

Democratic primary

Candidates

Declared 
 Ed Markey, incumbent U.S. Senator

Withdrew 
 John Kerry, U.S. Secretary of State and former U.S. Senator

Declined 
 Mo Cowan, former U.S. Senator

Republican primary

Candidates

Declared 
 Brian Herr, Hopkinton Selectman

Did not qualify 
 Frank Addivinola, attorney, candidate for Massachusetts's 5th congressional district in 2012 and 2013
 J. Mark Inman, contestant on The X Factor in 2011

Declined 
 Keith Ablow, psychiatrist and Fox News contributor
 Charlie Baker, former state cabinet secretary and nominee for governor in 2010 (ran for governor)
 Scott Brown, former U.S. Senator (ran for the U.S. Senate in New Hampshire)
 Gabriel E. Gomez, businessman, former Navy SEAL and nominee for the U.S. Senate in 2013
 Richard Tisei, former State Senate Minority Leader, nominee for lieutenant governor in 2010 and nominee for MA-06 in 2012 (ran for Congress)
 William Weld, former governor of Massachusetts and nominee for the U.S. Senate in 1996
 Daniel Winslow, former state representative and candidate for the U.S. Senate in 2013

Independent

Candidates

Withdrew 
 Bruce Skarin, government research scientist

General election

Predictions

Polling 

With Markey

With Kerry

Results

See also 
 2013 United States Senate special election in Massachusetts
 2014 United States Senate elections
 2014 Massachusetts gubernatorial election
 2014 United States elections

References

External links 
 U.S. Senate elections in Massachusetts, 2014 at Ballotpedia
 Campaign contributions at OpenSecrets.org
 Ed Markey for U.S. Senate
 Frank Addivinola for U.S. Senate
 Brian Herr for U.S. Senate
 Bruce Skarin for U.S. Senate

2014
Massachusetts
2014 Massachusetts elections